Mann & Wife is an American sitcom that premiered on the digital television network Bounce TV on April 7, 2015.

The series stars real-life married couple David Mann and Tamela Mann as newlywed couple Daniel and Toni Mann, who blend their family together after getting married. Both police officer Daniel and teacher Toni have children from previous relationships; Daniel has two boys and Toni has two girls. Toni and her girls move into Daniel's house in Atlanta with Daniel, his sons, and his mother Lorraine (Jo Marie Payton). The blended family must navigate their new lives together.

Bounce TV announced the series on May 5, 2014 and the series premiered April 7, 2015, with the first season consisting of 10 episodes. On June 16, 2015, Bounce TV renewed the series for a second season. On April 13, 2016, the show has been renewed for a third season. The show has yet to be cancelled or renewed for a fourth season.

Cast and characters

 David Mann as Daniel Mann, a police officer, Terri and Tasha's stepfather, DJ and Darren's father
 Tamela Mann as Toni Mann, a teacher, DJ and Darren's stepmother, Terri and Tasha's mother
 Jo Marie Payton as Lorraine Mann, Daniel's mother who lives with the family; a retired schoolteacher 
 Tony Rock as Michael Hobbs, Daniel's new partner
 Tiny Lister as Daniel's former lieutenant and boss
 John Marshall Jones as Daniel's new lieutenant and boss
 Steven Walsh, Jr. as Daniel "D.J." Leviticus Mann, Jr., Daniel's older son
 Lauryn Kennedy Hardy as Terri, Toni's older daughter
 Amir O'Neil as Darren Mann, Daniel's younger son
 Jadah Marie as Tasha, Toni's younger daughter

Recurring
 Vivica A. Fox as Michelle Mann, DJ and Darren's biological mother, Daniel's ex-wife
 J. Anthony Brown as Lionel Mann, Daniel's brother and Toni's brother-in-law
 Rolonda Watts as Shawna, choir director
 Maverick White as Moenah, school teacher

Development and production

Bounce TV announced the series in May 2014 with the series set to premiere in the winter of 2015. Production began in November 2014.

Bounce TV and Bobbcat Productions were in a legal battle over the Mann's in November 2014. When co-creator Roger M. Bobb pitched the series in February 2014, Bobbcat Productions also announced a reality series featuring the couple to air on BET. Since, Bobbcat Productions has found a way to honor both series and the series premiered as scheduled on April 7, 2015.

Episodes

Season 1 (2015)

Season 2 (2016)

Season 3 (2017)

Reception

Ratings
The premiere on April 7, 2015, was the most watched original programming for Bounce TV. The premiere episode garnered 0.46 million viewers, with 0.14 million in adults 18–49, and over .8 million viewers over its premiere time slots. The second episode grew to 1.3 million viewers over its time slots premieres.

References

External links
 
 

2010s American black sitcoms
2015 American television series debuts
English-language television shows
Bounce TV original programming
Television series about families